Jane Tilden, born as Marianne Wilhelmine Tuch, (1910–2002) was an Austrian actress who enjoyed a long career on stage and in films and television shows. She was born as Marianne Tuch in Aussig, then part of the Austro-Hungarian Empire. She was the sister of the cinematographer Walter Tuch. After making her debut on the stage in the early 1930s she appeared regularly in German and Austrian films during the Nazi era including the 1938 comedy The Blue Fox (1938). After the Second World War she worked regularly in film and television, increasingly in supporting roles. She was married three times, her husbands included the actor Erik Frey and composer Alexander Steinbrecher.

Selected filmography
 The Emperor's Candlesticks (1936)
 Hannerl and Her Lovers (1936)
 Flowers from Nice (1936)
 The Blue Fox (1938)
 Mirror of Life (1938)
 Happiness is the Main Thing (1941)
 Two Happy People (1943)
 Cordula (1950)
 Anna Louise and Anton (1953)
 Emperor's Ball (1956)
 The True Jacob (1960)
 The Good Soldier Schweik (1960)
 What Is Father Doing in Italy? (1961)
 Romance in Venice (1962)
 The Mad Aunts Strike Out (1971)
 The Count of Luxemburg (1972)
  (1976)
 Tales from the Vienna Woods (1979)
  (1981)
  (1983, TV film)

References

Bibliography 
 Waldman, Harry. Nazi Films In America, 1933-1942. McFarland & Co, 2008.

External links 
 

1910 births
2002 deaths
Austrian stage actresses
Austrian film actresses
20th-century Austrian actresses
People from Ústí nad Labem
Austrian people of German Bohemian descent